Thai Fight (stylized as THAI FIGHT in capitals) is a Muay Thai promotion based in Bangkok, Thailand, which hosts events worldwide and all across Thailand. Thai Fight events are produced in conjunction with the Tourism Authority of Thailand. The inaugural tournament took place on August 29, 2010, and the promotion has since featured notable fighters such as Sudsakorn Sor Klinmee, Saiyok Pumpanmuang, Yodsanklai Fairtex, Buakaw Banchamek and Saenchai.

In 2011, the King of Thailand Bhumibol Adulyadej (King Rama IX) started supporting the Thai Fight events and founded the Thai Fight King’s Cup Tournament. The winners are awarded the King’s Cup and a 1,000,000 Thai baht cash prize. The annual Thai Fight: King of Muay Thai tournament awards the finalist a grand prize of 2,000,000 baht and an Isuzu pickup truck.

History

Creation 
Thai Fight Co. Ltd. was founded by former film and television director Nopporn Wartin. His vision of spreading Thai culture and Thai traditions eventually led to the birth of the “Thai Fight” brand. Muay Thai being the national sport of Thailand, Wartin chose to use it as a platform to spread his vision to the rest of the world. The first Thai Fight event was hosted on August 29, 2010. Thai Fight fully embraces Thai cultural values and uniquely reflects Thai cultural identity.

Business 
The Thai Fight office is located in the Wang Thonglang District of Bangkok.  

After its founding in 2009, the company went on to host its first Thai Fight: King of Muay Thai tournament on August 29, 2010. Notable fighters who participated included Fabio Pinca, Youssef Boughanem, Liam Harrison and Vitaly Gurkov. The tournament concluded in December 6, 2010, with Pinca emerging as the first-ever Thai Fight champion.

In 2011, the promotion rose to further popularity with its signing of former K-1 World MAX champion and superstar Buakaw Banchamek, who would go on to win two Thai Fight tournaments in 2011 and 2012. However, he was engaged in a dispute with his gym at the time: Por. Pramuk. Buakaw appeared on THAI FIGHT Extreme 2012: Pattaya without the gym's approval, leading to them suing both him and Thai Fight. This resulted in Buakaw announcing his retirement from Muay Thai. Thai Fight would file a countersuit against Por. Pramuk, which eventually led to an agreement between all parties with withdraw all lawsuits. Buakaw fought on Thai Fight for the final time at Thai Fight 2012 on December 16, 2012, defeating Vitaly Gurkov to win the 70kg King's Cup Tournament Championship.   

Thai Fight held its first overseas event on May 14, 2011 with THAI FIGHT Extreme 2011: France in Cannes, France. In 2011, three of six Thai Fight events (titled THAI FIGHT Extreme) were held outside of Thailand, with the other two events taking place in Hong Kong and Japan. In 2012, Thai Fight also held two international events (also titled THAI FIGHT Extreme) in England and France. Between 2011 and 2013, ten THAI FIGHT Extreme events were hosted, five of which were held in foreign countries. 

Thai Fight returned to hosting overseas events in 2014 (titled THAI FIGHT World Battle), visiting Macau and Vietnam. In 2015, the promotion held events (now titled THAI FIGHT Proud to Be Thai) in China, Russia and Vietnam. The promotion regularly hosts events internationally, in countries such as: Russia, Italy, Spain, Japan, Cambodia, Vietnam, France and England. However, there has not been an international event since 2018.

On November 25, 2017, Thai Fight held the historic KHMER THAI FIGHT event. The event was held to strengthen ties between Thailand and Cambodia. Being held in Phnom Penh, Cambodia, the event was unlike previous Thai Fight events due to the fact that it featured both Muay Thai and Kun Khmer matches, with the event pitting the Southeast Asian fighters against various foreign fighters. 

As a result of the COVID-19 pandemic, Thai Fight held its first event behind closed doors in 11 years, with THAI FIGHT DMHTT at Siam Omnoi Stadium on April 25, 2021.

Tourism 
The promotion is run in conjunction with the Tourism Authority of Thailand and is aimed at promoting tourism in the Kingdom of Thailand.

Thai Fight Kard Chuek 
In 2013, the promotion produced a reality television show where Thai Fight stars Sudsakorn Sor Klinmee and Saiyok Pumpanmuang coached a team of farang on the reality television series Thai Fight Kard Chuek, to be shown over between July and August 2013 on Thailand's Channel 3. Notable fighters who appeared on the series included Youssef Boughanem and Tun Tun Min (credited as Zaw Tum). On December 22, 2013, the two coaches faced each other in the Thai Fight Kard Chuek Final, where Sor Klinmee defeated Pumpanmuang by extension-round decision to claim the 6,000,000 baht grand prize.

Thai Fight Kard Chuek also refers to the format of Muay Thai where fighters use rope bindings in place of gloves to pay homage to Muay boran, the historical form of the sport, with modern Muay Thai rules in place. Since 2014, most fights in Thai Fight have been predominantly fought under Kard Chuek rules with few exceptions using gloves.

Sponsorship 
The brand Thailand Graphite Co. Ltd, Isuzu, Thai Beverage and the Tourism Authority of Thailand are sponsors of the promotion.

Broadcasting 
For almost a decade, Thai Fight's longtime television partner was Channel 3. In 2020, it was announced that Thai Fight had entered a partnership with Channel 8, joining Muay Thai programs Super Champ Muay Thai and Muay Hardcore In 2022 was announced that Thai Fight had entered a Partner ship with 9 MCOT HD
 2022–Present  -  9 MCOT HD  
 2020–2022 – Channel 8
 2010–2019 – Channel 3.                                        

Beginning in 2019, the Thai Fight official YouTube channel also began broadcasting events via the YouTube livestreaming function.

Rules

Match length
Thai Fight deviates from customary Muay Thai by hosting three-round matches, as opposed to five rounds. This is to prevent stalling and encourage more activity between fighters. Each fight consists of three rounds of three minutes with 2-minute rest periods between each round.

In the event of a draw after 3 rounds, a fourth extension round will be fought. If the fight is still tied after 4 rounds, a fifth round will be fought to determine a winner.

Judging
Fights can be won by decision, knockout or technical knockout. Three knockdowns will automatically result in a technical knockout. 

In Thai Fight, knockdowns are scored differently from conventional Muay Thai and kickboxing. If a knockdown is scored, the dominant fighter will be awarded 10–9 round. In the event a fighter scores two knockdowns in the same round, the round will be scored 10–8 in favor of the dominant fighter. Otherwise, rounds are judged based on a fighter's aggression, striking volume and use of Muay Thai techniques. In recent Thai Fight events, use of certain mae mai and luk mai techniques can earn a fighter performance-based cash bonuses.

Weight classes
While there are no official weight classes in Thai Fight, with superfights being held at varying weight classes, there are 4 titles across three weight classes during the Thai Fight King's Cup Tournament. 

The inaugural Thai Fight tournament in 2010 saw fighters contesting for the 67kg welterweight tournament title. The 2011 tournament saw the introduction of the 70kg title. Up until 2013, the only tournament titles in Thai Fight were the 67kg and 70kg King's Cup Tournament. The 70kg Kard Chuek title was first contested for in 2013. In 2014, the first Thai Fight 72.5kg King's Cup Tournament was held. Thai Fight also held a one-time Heavyweight Tournament in 2012, where fighters weighing over 100 kilograms competed.

List of Thai Fight events

Champions

Thai Fight King’s Cups 
Starting in 2011, his majesty Bhumibol Adulyadej (King Rama IX) started gracing the trophies of the Thai Fight annual tournaments. The annual Thai Fight King’s Cup Tournament sees international fighters competing against Thailand's elite athletes and the winners of each weight divisions are awarded the King’s Cups and 1,000,000 Thai baht. Since his succession to the throne, King Maha Vajiralongkorn has continued the tradition started by his father. 

The 2020 schedule saw the introduction of the Queen's Cup, bestowed by Queen Suthida, which will be the first women's tournament in Thai Fight.

Tournament Champions 
The annual Thai Fight: King of Muay Thai tournament sees international and local fighters compete for the grand prize of 2,000,000 Thai baht and an Isuzu pickup truck.

Championship history

Heavyweight / 100+ kg King's Cup Championship

Middleweight / 72.5 kg King's Cup Championship

Middleweight / 72.5 kg Kard Chuek King's Cup Championship

Junior Middleweight / 70 kg King's Cup Championship

Junior Middleweight / 70 kg Kard Chuek King's Cup Championship

Welterweight / 67 kg King's Cup Championship

Women's Flyweight / 51 kg Queen's Cup Championship

Isuzu Cup Superfight  
Since 2012, Thai Fight has also hosted the Isuzu Cup Superfight. The Isuzu Cup Superfight is the only instance in Thai Fight where Thai fighters face each other. The winner of the Isuzu Cup Tournament is pitted against a hand-picked fighter from Thai Fight to contest for a multi-fight contract with the organization.

List of Isuzu Cup Superfight winners

Notable fighters

  Saenchai   
  Saensatharn P.K. Saenchai Muaythaigym 
  Chanajon P.K. Saenchai Muaythaigym 
  Kitti Sor.Jor.Danrayong 
  Tengnueng Sitjaesairoong  
  Por.Tor.Thor. Petchrungruang (Omnoi Stadium Champion, Isuzu Cup Winner)
  Kongklai AnnyMuayThai 
  Sudsakorn Sor Klinmee  
  Saiyok Pumpanmuang 
  Iquezang Kor.Rungthanakeat  
  Buakaw Banchamek 
  Yodsanklai Fairtex 
  Kem Sitsongpeenong 
  Singmanee Kaewsamrit 
  Antoine Pinto 
  Youssef Boughanem  
  Kongsak P.K. Saenchai Muaythaigym   
  Pakorn P.K. Saenchai Muaythaigym   
  Satanfah Rachanon   
  Panpayak Jitmuangnon  
  Han Zihao
  Alka Matewa 
  Abraham Roqueñi   
  Rafi Bohic  
  Morgan Adrar   
  Samy Sana   
  Jimmy Vienot   
  Chike Lindsay   
  Fabio Pinca  
  Franki Giorgi   
  Yodpayak Sitsongpeenong  
  Sasha Moisa    
  Anvar Boynazarov
  Naimjon Tuhtaboyev  
  Vitaly Gurkov  
  Andrei Kulebin   
  Tun Tun Min  
  Too Too   
  Armin Pumpanmuang

Master of Ceremony: MC
 Present
 Suriyon Aroonwattanakul (2016 - Present) 
 Premmanat Suwannanon (2016 - Present) 
  Mr.Phong - Thai commentator (2010 - Present)
 Major Dr.Somjit Jongjohor - Thai commentator (2010 - Present)
 Arran Sirisompan - English commentator (2015 - Present)
 Adam Martin - English commentator (2015 - Present)
 Thanasut Vudthivichai (Fighter introduction voice) (2010 - Present) 

 Former
 Matthew Deane - Host (2010 - 2015) 
 Kathsepsawad Palakawong Na Ayyuttaya - Host (2010 - 2013)
 Nok Tanee (2011 - 2012)
 Robert Cox-English commentator (2011-2014)
 Samart Payakaroon - Thai commentator 
 Somluck Kamsing - Thai commentator

See also
Sports broadcasting contracts in Thailand
Super Champ Muay Thai
Muay Hardcore 
Glory
Kunlun Fight
Wu Lin Feng
Lumpinee Stadium
Rajadamnern Stadium

References

External links

 THAI FIGHT Official Website 
 
 Thai Fight on YouTube 

Professional Muay Thai organizations
Organizations based in Bangkok
Muay Thai in Thailand
Muay Thai competitions in Thailand 
Kickboxing in Thailand 
Sports organizations established in 2009
2009 establishments in Thailand
Television in Thailand
Entertainment companies of Thailand
Kickboxing organizations